The Gordon Power Station is the largest conventional hydroelectric power station in Tasmania, Australia; located in the South West region of the state. The power station is situated on  Gordon River. Water from  Lake Gordon descends  underground past the Gordon Dam and into the power station.

Technical data
The first two turbines were commissioned in 1978, before the third was commissioned a decade later in 1988.

The power station is fuelled by water from Lake Gordon. Water from Lake Pedder is also drawn into Lake Gordon through the McPartlans Pass Canal.

The station output is fed from each machine by 18 kV aluminium busbars to the surface switchyard then passes through three 18/220 kV power transformers and 220 kV outdoor switchgear to 
TasNetworks' transmission grid. The switchyard also houses 22 kV apparatus used for power supply to the station and to the local community. The annual output is estimated to be .

2016 Tasmanian energy crisis

Due to drought, the BassLink power feed failure and Tasmanian energy needs, in early 2016, the water levels in Lake Gordon were at the lowest ever recorded (-55 meters from capacity). By January 2017 they had recovered 17 meters to −28 meters below capacity. Four years later, in June 2021, the water level had increased only 3 meters to -25 meters.

Gallery

See also 

List of power stations in Tasmania

References

External links
Hydro Tasmania page on the Gordon – Pedder

Energy infrastructure completed in 1978
Energy infrastructure completed in 1988
Hydroelectric power stations in Tasmania
Energy crisis, 2016
Gordon River power development scheme
1978 establishments in Australia